Sámi University of Applied Sciences is a university that is located in the village of Kautokeino in Kautokeino Municipality in Finnmark county, Norway.  It was established in 1989 and has about 200 students and 110 faculty, technical and administrative staff. It is one of 25 Norwegian state university colleges. Since 2009 it has been located at the campus complex of Diehtosiida.

Sámi University of Applied Sciences has a national responsibility for Sámi higher education, including education within teaching and journalism. The college attempts to develop its syllabi on the basis of Sámi needs, and attempts to develop Sámi as an academic language. The college has students from all four countries covered by Sápmi.

Notable people
 Laila Susanne Vars (born 1976) is a Norwegian-sámi lawyer and former politician
 Britta Marakatt-Labba - Sámi textile artist
 Pigga Keskitalo - Sámi politician and academic
 Per Isak Juuso (born 1953), Swedish-Sámi artisan and teacher

External links
Official Sámi University of Applied Sciences website

Sámi University of Applied Sciences
Kautokeino
Sámi in Norway
Sámi associations
Indigenous organisations in Norway
1989 establishments in Norway
Educational institutions established in 1989